Kazi Kamruzzaman is a Bangladeshi social worker and Chairman of Dhaka Community Hospital Trust. He was awarded the Ekushey Padak in 2021.

Career 
Kamruzzaman is a pediatric surgeon and the President of Society of Pediatrics Surgery. He is also a veteran of Bangladesh Liberation. He founded the Dhaka Community Hospital Trust with 20 beds in 1988 and is the chairperson of the Dhaka Community Hospital Trust, which owns Dhaka Community Hospital and the Dhaka Community Medical College.

References

Living people
Year of birth missing (living people)

Recipients of the Ekushey Padak

Bangladeshi pediatricians
Mukti Bahini personnel